Recollection Harvest is the twelfth studio album by Djam Karet, released on September 20, 2005 by Cuneiform Records.

Track listing

Personnel 
Adapted from Recollection Harvest liner notes.
Djam Karet
 Gayle Ellett – electric guitar, organ
 Mike Henderson – electric guitar, acoustic guitar
 Chuck Oken, Jr. – drums, percussion, synthesizer

Release history

References

External links 
 Recollection Harvest at Discogs (list of releases)
 Recollection Harvest at Bandcamp

2005 albums
Djam Karet albums
Cuneiform Records albums